Interstate 25 (I-25) in the US state of New Mexico follows the north–south corridor through Albuquerque and Santa Fe. It replaced U.S. Route 85 (US 85), which is no longer signed, but still exists in route logs sharing the I-25 alignment. I-25 starts in New Mexico at an interchange with I-10 in Las Cruces and extends roughly  before reaching Colorado. I-25 passes through principally rural land through central New Mexico and passes through or near the cities of Las Cruces, Truth or Consequences, Socorro, Belen, Albuquerque, Santa Fe, Las Vegas, and Raton.

Route description
I-25 begins at I-10's exit 144 in Las Cruces (elevation ), just south of the New Mexico State University (NMSU) campus. I-25 is concurrent with US 85 at this point, and carries US 85 concurrently for the remainder of its run in New Mexico, save for a  through Las Vegas where unsigned US 85 follows Interstate 25 Business (I-25 Bus., Business Loop 15) through the town. Immediately, the Interstate passes east of the NMSU campus, and the next three exits provide access to the city. The first exit is University Avenue, which provides access to NMSU. The final exit in Las Cruces is US 70. Before I-25 reaches Truth or Consequences and just south of Elephant Butte Reservoir State Park, it crosses over to the west side of the Rio Grande. From Las Cruces to Santa Fe I-25 follows the route of El Camino Real de Tierra Adentro.

South of Albuquerque near Socorro, it passes through the Bosque del Apache National Wildlife Refuge. As I-25 nears Albuquerque, it has interchanges with roads such as US 380 and a concurrency with US 60. State Road 6 (NM 6), the original US 66, meets up with I-25 in Los Lunas. Just to the south of Albuquerque, I-25 enters Isleta Pueblo where it crosses back to the east side of the Rio Grande.

Through Albuquerque, I-25 is named the Pan American Freeway and there are frequent exits to city streets. A major interchange with I-40 (which is styled as the Coronado Freeway in the city) is named the Big I. It was given an honorable mention by the United States Department of Transportation and the Federal Highway Administration for excellence in urban highway design in 2002.

Leaving Albuquerque, the  speed limit resumes as the freeway passes through Sandia Pueblo. After Bernalillo, I-25 passes through four more Indian Reservations (from south to north: the Pueblos of Santa Ana, San Felipe, Kewa, and Cochiti). I-25 turns to the northeast and away from the Rio Grande, alongside which it has run from its southern terminus, as it heads toward Santa Fe.

It turns north again at Blanchard toward Las Vegas. The highway maintains a north and northeast orientation as it leaves New Mexico traversing Raton Pass and enters Colorado. From Santa Fe to Raton Pass, I-25 approximates part of the route of the Santa Fe Trail.

Exit list

Related routes

I-25 in New Mexico currently has no auxiliary Interstates but it has six active business routes. The active business routes are located in Williamsburg–Truth or Consequences, Socorro, Belen, Las Vegas, Springer, and Raton. There was one other business route that was located in Santa Fe but was decommissioned.

References

External links

 New Mexico
25
Transportation in Doña Ana County, New Mexico
Transportation in Sierra County, New Mexico
Transportation in Socorro County, New Mexico
Transportation in Valencia County, New Mexico
Transportation in Bernalillo County, New Mexico
Transportation in Sandoval County, New Mexico
Transportation in Santa Fe County, New Mexico
Transportation in San Miguel County, New Mexico
Transportation in Mora County, New Mexico
Transportation in Colfax County, New Mexico
U.S. Route 85